Thomas Peverel (died 1419) was a medieval prelate who was successively bishop of Ossory, Llandaff, and Worcester.

Peverel was appointed the Bishop of Ossory by papal provision on 25 October 1395, and was translated to Llandaff on 12 July 1398. He was translated again to Worcester on 4 July 1407.

Peverel died in office on 1 or 2 March 1419.

Citations

References

 
 
 

Bishops of Worcester
1419 deaths
Bishops of Llandaff
14th-century English Roman Catholic bishops
15th-century English Roman Catholic bishops
Year of birth unknown